Turnera pumilea is a species of Turnera from Jamaica.

References

External links

pumilea
Flora of Jamaica
Flora without expected TNC conservation status